Euphaedra minuta, the Côte d'Ivoire forester, is a butterfly in the family Nymphalidae. It is found in Sierra Leone, Ivory Coast and Ghana. The habitat consists of wetter forests.

Adults are attracted to fallen fruit.

References

Butterflies described in 1982
minuta